The British and Irish Lions tour to New Zealand and Australia in 1950 was the first post-war tour made by the Lions; there had not been one since 1938.

The 1950 team was the first to be nicknamed "the British Lions", rather than just "British Isles" and sported newly redesigned jerseys and a fresh style of play, managing to win 22 and draw one of 29 matches over the two nations. The Lions won the opening four fixtures before losing to Otago and Southland, but succeeded in holding the All Blacks to a nine-all draw. The Lions performed well in the remaining All Black tests though they lost all three, the team did not lose another non-test in the New Zealand leg of the tour. The Lions won all their games in Australia except for their final fixture against a New South Wales XV in Newcastle. They won both of the two tests against Australia, in Brisbane and in Sydney.

Because the team was travelling by ship, rather than by air as modern tours do, they also stopped off in Ceylon to play an unofficial game against the national team.

Squad
Manager: L.B. Osborne  (England)

Results
Scores and results list British Isles' points tally first.

References

1950 rugby union tours
1950
1950
Rugby union tours of Sri Lanka
1950 in Australian rugby union
1949–50 in British rugby union
Lions